The Sony Xperia E5 is an Android smartphone manufactured by Sony Mobile Communications. It was announced in May 2016 and was released in June 2016.

Specifications

Hardware 
The device features a  720p screen, also features a 64-bit 1.3 GHz quad-core MediaTek MT6735 system-on-chip with 1.5 GB of RAM. The device also has 16 GB internal storage with microSD card expansion up to 200 GB and includes non-removable 2300 mAh battery.

The rear-facing camera of the Xperia E5 is 13 megapixels OV13850 from OmniVision. The front facing camera is 5MP.

Software
The Xperia E5 is preinstalled with Android 6.0.1 Marshmallow with Sony's custom interface and software. Sony Xperia E5 will not get an update to Android 7.0 Nougat.

Variants 

Here are the complete description of the Xperia E5 variants in the world:

See also 
 Sony Xperia X
 Sony Xperia XA

References

External links 

Official Whitepaper 

Android (operating system) devices
Sony smartphones